Anzhong Wang is a theoretical physicist, specialized in gravitation, cosmology and astroparticle physics. He is on the Physics faculty of Baylor University. Currently he is working on cosmology in string/M theory and the Hořava–Lifshitz gravity.

Wang is married to Yumei Wu, a mathematical physicist also at Baylor and they live in Waco, Texas, USA.

Research

Wang's research recently has principally focused on aspects of gravitation, cosmology and astrophysics, using tools from general relativity, superstring theory and M-Theory. His recent work includes investigations of late cosmic acceleration of the universe, cosmology in string/M Theory, thermodynamics of black holes and their formation from gravitational collapse, the Horava–Lifshitz quantum gravity and its applications to cosmology and astrophysics.

Publications

Wang has written over 100 research articles in scholarly journals on topics in gravitational theory, cosmology, string theory and high-energy astrophysics.

Some recent publications are

Honors
Wang received the Outstanding Researcher Award in May 2009 from Baylor University and is a member of the editorial board of Universe.

References

External links

List of papers at arXiv

American cosmologists
String theorists
Baylor University faculty
Living people
Year of birth missing (living people)
21st-century American physicists